Paul Gauduchon (born March 22, 1945) is a French mathematician, known for his work in the field of differential geometry. He is particularly known for his introduction of Gauduchon metrics in hermitian geometry. His textbook on spectral geometry, written with Marcel Berger and Edmond Mazet, is a standard reference in the field.

from 1965, Gauduchon studied at the École polytechnique and carried out research for the CNRS from 1968. In 1975, he received his doctorate (Doctor d'Etat) with André Lichnerowicz at the University of Paris VII and completed his habilitation in 1986. Since 1990 he has been research director of the CNRS at the Center de Mathématiques of the École Polytechnique in Palaiseau Paris. There he heads the geometry group and organizes the Arthur Besse seminar on Riemannian geometry. He also teaches at the Institut des Mathematiques de Jussieu.

Notable publications 
Marcel Berger, Paul Gauduchon, and Edmond Mazet. Le spectre d'une variété riemannienne. Lecture Notes in Mathematics, Vol. 194 Springer-Verlag, Berlin-New York 1971 vii+251 pp.  
 Paul Gauduchon. La 1-forme de torsion d'une variété hermitienne compacte.  Math. Ann. 267 (1984), no. 4, 495–518.  
Paul Gauduchon. Hermitian connections and Dirac operators. Boll. Un. Mat. Ital. B (7) 11 (1997), no. 2, suppl., 257–288.

References

External links 
Homepage
Conference for Gauduchon's 60th birthday (2005)

1945 births
Living people
French mathematicians
École Polytechnique alumni
French National Centre for Scientific Research scientists
Differential geometry
University of Paris alumni
Riemannian geometry

Spectral theory
Research directors of the French National Centre for Scientific Research